A. Sajeevan (എ. സജീവന്‍ in Malayalam) is a veteran journalist, author and channel debater in Malayalam language. He hails from Beypore, Kozhikkode dist. of Kerala state. He has worked with noted daily news papers which publish from Kerala. He has been known for his liberal and secular political views.

Early life 
He born on 15 February 1961 at Naduvattam of Beypore, an ancient seaport town in Kozhikkode dist., of Kerala state. His parents are Alancheri Shankaran (father) and Kausalya (mother). He completed his schooling at Govt. High School, Beypore. He has then studied at Govt. arts & science college, Calicut from where he obtained master's degree in Malayalam language. Later he did graduation in LLB from Government Law College, Kozhikode. He married K. Krishna Kumari. They have two children who are Hrithik S.K. and Hrishikesh S. Krishana.

Career 
As a journalist, he has worked with some of the well known journals including Kerala Kaumudi, Kalakaumudi and Mamagalam Malayalam dailies. Currently he is the executive editor of Suprabhaatham daily which publishes from Kozhikkode. He has been working at Suprabhaatham since its inception.

Bibliography 

 Thikkodiyante Kalam- 2009
 Ezhuthinte Akasam, M. T. Yude Jeevitham- 2010
 Em Tiyude Jeevitham
 Em Ti Novel Padanangal
 Guro Porukkuka - Sree Narayana Guru- 2015
 Oru Amusliminte Priyapetta Islam-2016
 Chiri Vaidyam- 2017

Awards

For the contribution in Literature   

 S.K. Pottekkad Award (Thikkodiyante kaalam)
 Panthirukulam Award (Guro Porukkuka)
 Shankarankutty Memorial Award (Guro Porukkuka)

For the Contribution in Journalism 

 C.H. Muhammad Koya Award
 Kerala State Govt. Journalism Award
Mohammed Abdur Rahiman Award
 Thoppil Ravi Award
 Suraksha Award
 Odeesi Award
 Madhyama Ratna Award
 J.K. Foundation Award

References 

Indian television presenters
Malayali people
Journalists from Kerala
1961 births
Indian male journalists
20th-century Indian journalists
Indian editors
People from Kozhikode district
Malayalam-language journalists
Living people
Malayalam-language writers
Writers from Kerala